Coras de Nayarit is a basketball club based in Tepic, Nayarit, Mexico that plays in the Circuito de Baloncesto de la Costa del Pacífico (CIBACOPA).  Their home games are played at Gimnasio Estatal Niños Heroes.

External links
Presentation on facebook
Latinbasket.com club profile

Basketball teams in Mexico
Sports teams in Nayarit
Sport in Tepic
Basketball teams established in 2001
2001 establishments in Mexico